Pushkar is a name of the following people
Given name
Pushkar Bhan (1926–2008), radio actor and script writer from Kashmir
Pushkar Goggiaa, Indian television actor
Pushkar Lele (born 1979), Hindustani classical vocalist
Chautariya Pushkar Shah (1784–1841), prime minister of Nepal 
Pushkar Shah, Nepalese peace and democracy activist and adventurer
Pushkar Sharma, Indian medical scientist
Pushkar Shrotri, Indian film and theatre actor

Surname
Pushkar-Gayathri, Tamil film director duo
Martyn Pushkar (died 1658), Ukrainian Cossack leader and government official
Pankaj Pushkar, Indian politician
Sunanda Pushkar (1962–2014), Indian businesswoman
Vitali Pushkar (born 1983), Israeli swimmer
Vitaliy Pushkar (born 1987), Ukrainian rally driver

See also
Pushkar (city in India)
Pushka (disambiguation) (Пушка a gun or cannon in the Russian language) 
Pushkaryov
Puškarić
Pușcaș
Puskás